FC Ternopil is a Ukrainian amateur football club based in Ternopil, Ukraine. The club was originally created as a second team of FC Nyva Ternopil. After its reformation and return to professional level, the club competed in the Ukrainian Second League.

History

Nyva Ternopil farm team
In 2000 at the initiative of Ternopil Mayor Anatoliy Kucherenko, the Ternopil Pedagogical Lyceum (college) of the Ternopil Volodymyr Hnatyuk National Pedagogical University established a team Nyva Ternopil-2, which became a farm club of Nyva Ternopil. The club participated in the Ukrainian Second League during the 2000–01 and 2001–02 seasons. However, after the winter beak in 2002 the club changed their name to FC Ternopil. At the end of the 2001–02 season the main club was relegated from the Ukrainian First League and FC Ternopil lost its professional license.

In 2003, the team called Burevisnyk was formed and began competing in the top league of Ternopil obslast, representing Ternopil Pedagogical University.

Independent municipal team and club
On May 16, 2007 the team ceased its affiliation with Nyva Ternopil and formed a single club – Ternopil-Burevisnyk. In the same year the team won their first trophy – as champions of Ternopil oblast.

The club continued to perform successfully in the Ternopil Oblast league as well as winning the Ternopil Oblast Cup and Super Cup in 2010 and 2011.

The club also represented Ukraine in the European University games and were champions in 2009.

In June 2012 the club applied for a professional license with the PFL and was granted entry to the Ukrainian Second League for the 2012–13 season.

After two seasons the club was promoted to the Ukrainian First League after finishing 3rd in 2014.
In the 2015–16 season the club finished in 15th and were to be relegated but the Professional Football League of Ukraine decided to expand the competition for the next season to 18 teams and the club was left in the First League.

Ternopil sports school
In 2018 the Ternopil sports school financed by the municipal government and under the same logo as the city's club entered national amateur football competitions. The head coach of the team Andiry Yablonskyi in interview stated that the new team is not a direct descendant of the former city's club. Many players were taken from another city's team Ternopil-Pedlitsei that competes at regional level.

Honors
 Champions of Ternopil Oblast – 2007, 2009, 2010, 2011
 Ternopil Oblast Cup Winners – 2001, 2009, 2010
 Silver medalist of Ukraine among college competition – 2009, 2010
 European University Champions – 2009

Team photographs

League and cup history

FC Ternopil Nyva-2

FC Ternopil

FC Ternopil-DYuSSh

Players

Current squad

Managers
 2007-2016 Vasyl Ivehesh
 2016 Ivan Marushchak
 2016-2017 Vasyl Matviykiv (caretaker)
 2017 Petr Badlo

See also
PFC Nyva Ternopil
FC Chortkiv
Ternopil City Stadium
Ternopil Volodymyr Hnatyuk National Pedagogical University

Notes

References

External links
Official website

 
Association football clubs established in 2007
2007 establishments in Ukraine
Football clubs in Ternopil
Amateur football clubs in Ukraine